Anne Jarvis (born 31 July 1962) was the first woman to be the University Librarian at the University of Cambridge. She held the office of Cambridge University Librarian from January 2009 until September 2016. Since October 2016 she has been the Princeton University librarian.

Jarvis studied history at Trinity College, Dublin, and later worked at that institution's library as Sub-Librarian, Collection Management. From 2000 to 2009 she worked at Cambridge University Library
as Deputy Librarian, and has also been affiliated to Wolfson College, Cambridge. In April 2016, she announced her move to be University Librarian at Princeton University.

References

External links
 Paton, Graeme, 'Cambridge University appoints first female librarian ', The Telegraph, 26 January 2009.
 'Anne Jarvis becomes Cambridge University's first female librarian', The Mirror, 27 January 2009.
 'Cambridge library's first female librarian', 1 January 2009.
 'National Union of Teachers'

1962 births
Irish librarians
Alumni of Trinity College Dublin
Cambridge University Librarians
Fellows of Wolfson College, Cambridge
Living people
British women librarians